The 1960 European Women's Basketball Championship was the 7th regional championship held by FIBA Europe for women. The competition was held in Sofia, Bulgaria and took place June 3–11, 1960. The Soviet Union won the gold medal, while hosts Bulgaria received the silver. Czechoslovakia won the bronze medal.

Preliminary round
The teams where divided into two groups. The first three from each group would go to the Final Round. The remaining teams went to the Classification Round to determine the 7th–10th spots.

Group A

Group B

Classification round

The results from the following matches were carried over to this round:

Italy vs. Netherlands
Hungary vs. Belgium

Final round

The results from the following matches carried over to this round:

Soviet Union vs. Yugoslavia
Soviet Union vs. Romania
Czechoslovakia vs. Bulgaria
Czechoslovakia vs. Poland
Poland vs. Bulgaria
Yugoslavia vs. Romania

Final standings

External links
 FIBA Archive

1960
1960 in women's basketball
1960 in Bulgarian women's sport
International basketball competitions hosted by Bulgaria
June 1960 sports events in Europe
Women's basketball competitions in Bulgaria
Women